This is a timeline documenting events of Jazz in the year 1913.

Events
 The word "jazz" first appears in print.
 James Reese Europe records ragtime arrangements in New York with the first black ensemble to be recorded.

Standards

Births

 January
 17 – Vido Musso, Italian-American tenor saxophonist, clarinetist, and bandleader (died 1982).
 27 – Milton Adolphus, American pianist and composer (died 1998).

 February
 5 – Rozelle Claxton, American pianist (died 1995).
 22 – Buddy Tate, American saxophonist and clarinetist (died 2001).

 March
 1 – Ralph Ellison, American novelist and literary critic (died 1994).
 31 – Etta Baker, American guitarist and singer (died 2006).

 April
 4
 Gene Ramey, American upright bassist (died 1984).
 Muddy Waters, African-American blues guitarist and singer-songwriter (died 1983).
 25 – Earl Bostic, American alto saxophonist (died 1965).
 29 – Jack Bentley, English trombonist, journalist, and scriptwriter (died 1994).

 May
 16 – Woody Herman, American clarinetist, saxophonist, singer, and big band leader (died 1987).

 June
 14 – Stanley Black, English bandleader, composer, conductor, arranger and pianist (died 2002).
 20 – Alfred Gallodoro, American musician (died 2008).
 23 – Helen Humes, American singer (died 1981).
 25 – Adele Girard, American harpist (died 1993).

 July
 5 – Smiley Lewis, American singer and guitarist (died 1966).
 18 – Nat Temple, British big band leader (died 2008).

 August
 7 – George Van Eps, American guitarist (died 1998).
 13 – Anna Mae Winburn, African-American vocalist and bandleader (died 1999).
 23 – Bob Crosby, American singer and bandleader (died 1993).

 September
 10 – Cliff Leeman, American drummer (died 1986).
 19 – Helen Ward, American singer (died 1998).
 20 – John Collins, American guitarist (died 2001).
 24 – Herb Jeffries, African-American actor and singer-songwriter (died 2014).
 26 – Dorothy Sloop, American pianist (died 1998).

 October
 1 – Harry Lookofsky, American violinist (died 1998).
 2 – Wally Rose, American pianist (died 1997).
 15 – Thore Jederby, Swedish upright bassist, record producer, and radio broadcaster (died 1984).
 19 – Vinicius de Moraes, Brazilian singer, poet, lyricist, essayist, and playwright (died 1980).
 21
 Cosimo Di Ceglie, Italian guitarist (died 1980).
 Gus Clark, Belgian pianist (died 1979).
 26 – Charlie Barnet, American saxophonist, composer, and bandleader (died 1991).
 27 – Boyd Raeburn, American bandleader and bass saxophonist (heart attack) (died 1966).

 November
 13
 Singleton Palmer, American bassist, cornetist, tubist, and bandleader (died 1993).
 Blue Lu Barker, American singer (died 1998).
 15 – Gus Johnson, American drummer (died 2000).
 19 – Blue Barron, American orchestra leader (died 2005).

 December
 7 – Blind John Davis, African-American, blues, jazz and boogie-woogie pianist and singer (died 1985).
 10
 Pannonica de Koenigswarter, British-born jazz patron and writer (died 1988).
 Ray Nance, American trumpeter, violinist and singer (died 1976).
 12 – Don Stovall, American alto saxophonist (died 1970).
 14 – Ted Buckner, American saxophonist (died 1976).
 25 – Candy Candido, American bassist and vocalist (died 1999).

References

External links
 History Of Jazz Timeline: 1913 at All About Jazz

Jazz by year
Jazz, 1913 In